Ferritin heavy chain is a ferroxidase enzyme that in humans is encoded by the FTH1 gene. FTH1 gene is located on chromosome 11, and its mutation causes Hemochromatosis type 5.

Function 

This gene encodes the heavy subunit of ferritin, the major intracellular iron storage protein in prokaryotes and eukaryotes. It is composed of 24 subunits of the heavy and light ferritin chains. Variation in ferritin subunit composition may affect the rates of iron uptake and release in different tissues. A major function of ferritin is the storage of iron in a soluble and nontoxic state. Defects in ferritin proteins are associated with several neurodegenerative diseases. This gene has multiple pseudogenes. Several alternatively spliced transcript variants have been observed, but their biological validity has not been determined.

Interactions 

FTH1 has been shown to interact with ferritin light chain.

See also 
 Ferritin

References

Further reading 

 
 
 
 
 
 
 
 
 
 
 
 
 
 
 
 
 
 
 

EC 1.16.3